The 13th Pan American Games were held in Winnipeg, Manitoba, Canada from July 23 to August 8, 1999.

Medals

Bronze

Men's Olympic Sprint (Track): Mario Joseph

Results by event

See also
Trinidad and Tobago at the 2000 Summer Olympics

References

T&T Olympic Committee

Nations at the 1999 Pan American Games
P
1999